Waldemar Semelka (8 January 1920 – 21 August 1942) was a German Luftwaffe military aviator and fighter ace during World War II. He is credited with 75 aerial victories, all of which claimed on the Eastern Front, achieved in 240 combat missions.

Born in Dombrau, Semelka joined the military service in the Luftwaffe. Following flight training, he was posted to Jagdgeschwader 52 (JG 52—52nd Fighter Wing). Semelka claimed his first aerial victory on 22 June 1941, the first day of Operation Barbarossa, the German invasion of the Soviet Union. In June 1942, he was temporarily geven command of 5. Staffel (5th squadron) of JG 52. In late July, he was tasked with leading 4. Staffel of JG 52. Semelka was killed in action on 21 August 1942 near Srednyaya Akhtuba during the Battle of Stalingrad. Posthumously, he was awarded the Knight's Cross of the Iron Cross.

Military career
Semelka was born on 8 January 1920 in Dombrau, at the time in the Teschen District which after World War I became disputed land between the Czechoslovak Republic and the Second Polish Republic. Present-day, Dombrau is Doubrava in the Czech Republic.

Following flight training, Semelka was posted to 4. Staffel (4th squadron) of Jagdgeschwader 52 (JG 52—52nd Fighter Wing), a squadron of II. Gruppe (2nd group) of JG 52 in 1941. In preparation of Operation Barbarossa, the German invasion of the Soviet Union, II. Gruppe of JG 52, without a period of replenishment in Germany, was ordered to airfields close to the German-Soviet demarcation line. While the Gruppenstab (group headquarters unit) and 4. Staffel were based at Suwałki in northeastern Poland, 5. and 6. Staffel were transferred to a forward airfield at Sobolewo. For the invasion, II. Gruppe of JG 52 was subordinated to the Geschwaderstab (headquarters unit) of Jagdgeschwader 27 (JG 27—27th Fighter Wing). The Geschwader was part of the  VIII. Fliegerkorps commanded by Generaloberst Wolfram Freiherr von Richthofen which supported the northern wing of Army Group Centre.

Operation Barbarossa
At the start of Operation Barbarossa on 22 June 1941, Semelka's 4. Staffel was headed by Oberleutnant Johannes Steinhoff and II. Gruppe was commanded by Hauptmann Erich Woitke. The Gruppe supported the advancing 9th Army and 3rd Panzer Group in their attack on the border fortifications east and southeast of Suwałki. Semelka claimed his first aerial victory on the morning of 22 June when he shot down a Polikarpov I-15 fighter. On 25 June, the Gruppe moved to an airfield at Varėna in Lithuania which had previously been occupied by the Soviet Air Forces (VVS—Voyenno-Vozdushnye Sily). Two days later, the Gruppe moved to Maladzyechna, supporting the advance Panzergruppe 3 near Barysaw. Flying from this airfield, Semelka claimed an Ilyushin DB-3 bomber shot down on 2 July. Two days later, the Gruppe moved to Sloboda, east of Minsk, before moving to an airfield named Lepel-West at Lyepyel on 5 July. From this airfield, II. Gruppe flew combat air patrols and fighter escort missions to combat areas near Vitebsk and Haradok, supporting Panzergruppe 2 and 3 in their advance to Vitebsk and Polotsk. Here, Semelka claimed the destruction of another DB-3 bomber on 6 July.

II. Here, the Gruppe supported the fighting south of Lake Ilmen, and the German attacks on Shlisselburg, Leningrad and the Soviet fleet at Kronstadt. Operating from Soltsy, Semelka claimed an I-17 fighter, an early war designation for the Mikoyan-Gurevich MiG-1, and a Vultee V-11 ground attack aircraft, probably referring to the Ilyushin Il-2, shot down on 14 August. On 24 August, II. Gruppe was ordered to an airfield at Spasskaya Polist on the river Polist, south of Chudovo and north of Novgorod on Lake Ilmen, supporting the 18th Army in its advance towards the Neva and Lake Ladoga. Semelka claimed three fighters while flying from Spasskaya Polist, one Polikarpov I-16 on 25 August and two I-17 fighters the following day.

Since German forces had reached the proximity of Leningrad, II. The Gruppe stayed at Lyuban until 30 September, flying missions to Shlisselburg, Leningrad and Mga. Fighting in this combat area, Semelka claimed four aerial victories in September 1941. On 11 September, he was credited with the destruction of an I-18 fighter, also referring to the MiG-1 fighter, followed by an Il-2 ground attack aircraft and an I-18 fighter on 23 September, and a Petlyakov Pe-2 bomber on 24 September. On 2 October, German forces launched Operation Typhoon, the failed strategic offensive to capture Moscow. In support of this offensive, II. Gruppe was moved to Stabna, located just north of Smolensk.

On 12 October, II. Gruppe was ordered to Novodugino where it stayed for four days. The Gruppe then moved to an airfield west of Kalinin, present-day Tver, on 16 October. While stationed at Kalinin, the Gruppe was so close to the front line that their airbases were shelled by Russian artillery, and ground crew had to defend against enemy attacks. On 4 November, II. Gruppe had moved to Ruza. There, Semelka claimed an I-18 fighter on 6 November and two further I-18 fighters on 14 November. On 27 November, he claimed his 17th in total and last aerial victory of 1941, a BB-22 light bomber/reconnaissance aircraft referring to the Yakovlev Yak-2.

Eastern Front
In late January 1942, II. Gruppe was withdrawn from the Eastern Front and sent to Jesau near Königsberg for a period of recuperation and replenishment, arriving on 24 January 1942. In Jesau, the Gruppe received many factory new Bf 109 F-4 aircraft. On 14 April, II. Gruppe received orders to move to Pilsen, present-day Plzeň in the Czech Republic, for relocation to the Eastern Front. The Gruppe had also received a new commander, Woitke had been transferred and was replaced by Hauptmann Steinhoff. The Gruppe then moved to Wien-Schwechat on 24 April before flying to Zürichtal, present-day Solote Pole, a village near the urban settlement Kirovske in the Crimea. There, II. Gruppe participated in Operation Trappenjagd, a German counterattack during the Battle of the Kerch Peninsula, launched on 8 May. Slightly injured, he returned to his unit on foot.

On 16 May, II. Gruppe relocated to Artyomovsk, present-day Bakhmut where JG 52 supported the German forces fighting in the Second Battle of Kharkov. Operating from Artyomovsk, the Gruppe flew combat missions in the combat area of Izium, flying fighter escort for bombers from Kampfgeschwader 27 (KG 27—27th Bomber Wing) and Sturzkampfgeschwader 77 (StG 77—77th Dive Bomber Wing). Here, Semelka claimed an Il-2 ground-attack aircraft shot down on 23 May. That day, the Gruppe was ordered to relocate to Barvinkove where they stayed until 1 June. From Barvinkove, Semelka claimed one aerial victory on 24 May, two on 25 May, three on 26 May, and again three on 28 May, taking his total to 27 aerial victories.

Squadron leader and death
On 29 May 1942, Oberleutnant Siegfried Simsch, the commander of 5. Staffel, was wounded in combat. In consequence, Semelka was transferred to 5. Staffel to temporarily lead the Staffel as Staffelführer (squadron leader). On 1 June, II. Gruppe moved to an airfield at Grakowo, located approximately halfway between Kharkov and Kupiansk. The main German objectives in that combat area were, breakthrough to the upper Don and capture of Voronezh. That day, Semelka claimed a MiG-1 fighter shot down. Flying from Grakowo, Semelka claimed 18 further aerial victories in June 1942, one on 3 June, two on 9 June, two on 13 June, and again two the following day, one on 16 and 21 June each, four on 22 June, one on 23 June, three on 24 June, and lastly, one on 25 June, taking his total to 46 aerial victories. The Gruppe stayed at Grakowo until 26 June when it moved to Bilyi Kolodiaz.

On 28 June, the Wehrmacht initiated Fall Blau (Case Blue), the 1942 strategic summer offensive in southern Russia. The objective was to secure the oil fields of Baku as well as an advance in the direction of Stalingrad along the Volga River, to cover the flanks of the advance towards Baku. Tasked with aerial support of this offensive was Luftflotte 4 (Air Fleet 4) to which JG 52 was subordinated. On 1 July, command of 5. Staffel was transferred to Leutnant Heinz Schmidt and Semelka was transferred back to 4. Staffel which was under the command of Oberleutnant Gerhard Barkhorn. On 6 July, Semelka was awarded the Honour Goblet of the Luftwaffe. On 17 July, II. Gruppe moved to Taganrog, staying there until 22 July. Here, Semelka increased his number of aerial victories to 55 claims, three on 19 July, two on 20 July, one the next day, and three on 22 June.

On 22 July, II. The following day, Semelka became an "ace-in-a-day" for the first time when shot down six Il-2 ground-attack aircraft. The following day, he shot down four further Il-2 ground-attack aircraft. On 25 July, he was given temporary command of the 4. Staffel when the commander Oberleutnant Barkhorn was wounded in combat.

On 18 August he shot down five fighters making him an "ace-in-a-day" for the second time, in two missions over the Black Sea coast near Novorossiysk. The next day, Steinhoff led II. Gruppe of JG 52 to the Stalingrad sector to cover the imminent storming of the city. On 21 August, in their first operational sorties, Semelka shot down three fighters, bringing his total to 65. However, later that same day he was reported missing to the south of Stalingrad. It is possible he was shot down and killed by return fire from Pe-2 bombers of 86 BAP (Bombardirovochnyy Aviatsionyy Polk—Bomber Aviation Regiment). Alternatively, Semelka may have been shot down in his Bf 109 G-2 (Werknummer 13558) by a Douglas A-20 Havoc bomber north of Srednyaya Akhtuba. At the time of his death, he was the third-highest claiming fighter pilot in II. Gruppe of JG 52. Posthumously, he was awarded the Knight's Cross of the Iron Cross on 4 September 1942. Depending on source, the German Cross in Gold was either awarded the day he was killed,  or also posthumously on 7 September 1942.

Summary of career

Aerial victory claims
According to Obermaier, Semelka claimed 75 aerial victories in approximately 240 combat missions, while Spick lists him with 65 aerial victories. The US historian David T. Zabecki also lists Semelka with 65 aerial victories. Mathews and Foreman, authors of Luftwaffe Aces – Biographies and Victory Claims, researched the German Federal Archives and found records for 74 aerial victory claims, plus three further unconfirmed claim. All of his aerial victories were claimed on the Eastern Front.

Victory claims were logged to a map-reference (PQ = Planquadrat), for example "PQ 75424". These sectors were then subdivided into 36 smaller units to give a location area 3 × 4 km in size.

Awards
 Honour Goblet of the Luftwaffe on 6 July 1942 as Leutnant and pilot
 German Cross in Gold on 21 August 1942 as Leutnant in the 4./Jagdgeschwader 52
 Knight's Cross of the Iron Cross on 4 September 1942 as Leutnant and pilot in the 4./Jagdgeschwader 52

Notes

References

Citations

Bibliography

 
 
 
 
 
 
 
 
 
 
 
 
 
 
 
 
 
 

1920 births
1942 deaths
People from Karviná District
German World War II flying aces
Recipients of the Gold German Cross
Recipients of the Knight's Cross of the Iron Cross
Naturalized citizens of Germany
Luftwaffe personnel killed in World War II
Silesian-German people